Leutnant Roman Schneider was a German World War I flying ace credited with five aerial victories.

Biography
Roman Schneider was born in Passau, Kingdom of Bavaria on 9 August 1898.

Schneider joined the German military as a cadet corps officer. On 15 July 1916, just shy of his 18th birthday, he began service in the infantry. On 22 August 1917, he began pilot training. Upon completion, he was posted to Jagdstaffel 79 on 9 February 1918. Between 14 May and 5 October 1918, he shot down five enemy airplanes. He was awarded both classes of the Iron Cross. He also acted as acting commander of his squadron on two occasions--May, 1918 and from 15 September to 10 October 1918.

Sources of information

Reference
 Above the Lines: The Aces and Fighter Units of the German Air Service, Naval Air Service and Flanders Marine Corps, 1914–1918. Norman Franks, Frank W. Bailey, Russell Guest. Grub Street, 1993. , .

1898 births
1967 deaths
German World War I flying aces
People from Passau
Recipients of the Iron Cross (1914)